Chestwood is an MTR Light Rail stop. It is located at ground level at the centre of Tin Wing Road, between Chestwood Court, Kingswood Villas Phase III, and Tin Chung Court, in Tin Shui Wai, Yuen Long District. It began service on 26 March 1995 and belongs to Zone 4.

References

MTR Light Rail stops
Former Kowloon–Canton Railway stations
Tin Shui Wai
Railway stations in Hong Kong opened in 1995
MTR Light Rail stops named from housing estates
1995 establishments in Hong Kong